Molyneux is a surname.

Molyneux may also refer to:

Molyneux baronets
Molyneux River, a former name for New Zealand's Clutha River
Molyneux Park, a sports ground in Alexandra, New Zealand, close to the Clutha River
Port Molyneux, a former town close to the river's mouth
 Molineux Stadium, home ground of Wolverhampton Wanderers Football Club 
Molyneux (ward), an electoral ward of the Sefton Metropolitan Borough Council, England

See also
Molyneux's problem, a philosophical thought experiment
Molyneux globes, terrestrial and celestial spheres made by Emery Molyneux
Molineux (disambiguation)
Moulineaux, a commune in the Seine-Maritime department in the Normandy region in northern France